Government Degree College Kalakote (GDC Kalakote) is a government run educational college located in the Kalakote town of Rajouri district in the Indian union territory of Jammu and Kashmir. It is affiliated with Jammu University and is recognised by the University Grants Commission.

History 
On June 30, 2011, Jammu and Kashmir government has approved setting up of 22 new degree colleges in the state (now UT). The degree colleges were purposed to set up under the centrally sponsored scheme Establishment of Model Degree Colleges in Educationally Backward districts.

Academics 
The college offers Bachelor of Arts and Bachelor of Science degrees in various subjects. There are total of 161 students and 8 teachers in college. Many camps, conferences and awareness programs also organised for students.

Campus 

The old campus of GDC Kalakote was inside the campus of Government Higher Secondary School Kalakote and was functioning with only three rooms. In 2023, classes were moved to the newly built campus at Chainpur village about 2 km away from old campus. The new campus is a two-floor building with classrooms, library, computer lab and some open area for sports and other activities.

See also 

 Kalakote
 Thermal Power Plant Kalakote
 Kalakote Assembly constituency

References 

Jammu Division
Educational institutions established in 2011
2011 establishments in Jammu and Kashmir
Universities and colleges in Jammu and Kashmir
University of Jammu